Lydellothelaira is a genus of bristle flies in the family Tachinidae.

Species
Lydellothelaira collaris Townsend, 1919

Distribution
Brazil, Peru.

References

Exoristinae
Diptera of South America
Tachinidae genera
Monotypic Brachycera genera
Taxa named by Charles Henry Tyler Townsend